There were seven special elections to the United States House of Representatives in 1881 during the 47th United States Congress.

List of elections 
Elections are listed by date and district.

|-
| 
| colspan=3 | Vacant
|  | Incumbent member-elect Omar D. Conger (R) resigned during previous congress.New member elected April 5, 1881.Republican gain.Successor seated December 5, 1881 with the rest of the House.
| nowrap | 

|-
| 
| colspan=3 | Vacant
|  | Incumbent member-elect Fernando Wood (R) resigned during previous congress.New member elected November 8, 1881.Democratic gain.Successor seated December 5, 1881 with the rest of the House.
| nowrap | 

|-
| 
| Levi P. Morton
|  | Republican
| 1878
|  | Incumbent resigned March 21, 1881 to become U.S. Minister to France.New member elected November 8, 1881.Democratic gain.Successor seated December 5, 1881 with the rest of the House.
| nowrap | 

|-
| 
| Warner Miller
|  | Republican
| 1878
|  | Incumbent resigned July 26, 1881 when elected U.S. Senator.New member elected November 8, 1881.Republican hold.Successor seated December 5, 1881 with the rest of the House.
| nowrap | 

|-
| 
| Elbridge G. Lapham
|  | Republican
| 1874
|  | Incumbent resigned July 29, 1881 when elected U.S. Senator.New member elected November 8, 1881.Republican hold.Successor seated December 5, 1881 with the rest of the House.
| nowrap | 

|-
| 
| William P. Frye
|  | Republican
| 1870
|  | Incumbent resigned March 17, 1881 when elected U.S. Senator.New member elected September 12, 1881.Republican hold.Successor seated December 5, 1881 with the rest of the House.
| nowrap | 

|-
| 
| Nelson W. Aldrich
|  | Republican
| 1878
|  | Incumbent resigned when elected U.S. Senator.New member elected November 22, 1881.Republican hold.Successor seated December 5, 1881 with the rest of the House.
| nowrap | 

|}

Notes

References 

 
1881